Bernard Bloodworth (13 December 1893 – 19 February 1967) was an English cricketer. He played for Gloucestershire between 1919 and 1932.

References

1893 births
1967 deaths
English cricketers
Gloucestershire cricketers
Sportspeople from Cheltenham